The Los Padres League was a high school athletic conference in California that was part of the CIF Southern Section (CIF-SS). Member schools were located in San Luis Obispo and northern Santa Barbara counties. The league was dissolved in 2018 after most of its member schools left the CIF-SS for the CIF Central Section and formed a new conference, the Central Coast Athletic Conference, with members of the Pac-8 League. The three southernmost Los Padres League members — Lompoc, Cabrillo, and Santa Ynez high schools — remained in the CIF-SS as part of the Channel League.

Member schools
As of the 2014–15 school year, the schools in the league were:

 Cabrillo High School
 Lompoc High School
 Morro Bay High School 
 Nipomo High School 
 Orcutt Academy High School 
 Santa Maria High School 
 Santa Ynez High School
 Templeton High School

Football
 Cabrillo High School
 Lompoc High School
 Pioneer Valley High School
 St. Joseph High School
 Santa Ynez High School

References

CIF Southern Section leagues